Abu Esmail Moayed-o-din Hosein-ebn-e-ali Esfahani Togharayi was an Iranian poet and scholar of the Seljuq period. He was born in Isfahan, Iran in 1045 A.D.

He had mastered all sciences of his time, and he also wrote some books about alchemy, such as Jame-ol-asrar, Trakib-ol-anvar, and Masabih-ol-hekmat va Mafatih-ol-rahmat, Haghaegh-ol-esteshhadat, Zat-ol-faraed, and Alrad Ali-ebn-e-sina fi Ebtal-el-kimia.

He also participated in political works and became the minister of Masoud-ebn-Mohamad Malek Shah.

Togharayi wrote a book of poems, the best known of which is Lamiyat al-Ajam (L-Poem of the non-Arabs).  Togharayi wrote Lamiyyat al-Ajam as a response to the celebrated pre-Islamic poem Lāmiyyāt al-‘Arab (L-Poem of the Arabs).  Lamiyyat al-Ajam was later the subject of an encyclopedic 14th-century commentary by Al-Safadi, entitled Al-Ghayth al-Musajam fi Sharh Lamiyyat-Ajam (Flowing Desert Rains in the Commentary upon the L-Poem of the Non-Arabs).

Togharayi was ultimately accused of atheism, and executed in 1105 A.D.

References

1045 births
1105 deaths
Persian-language poets
Iranian male poets